Sporting Club de Schiltigheim is a French association football club from Schiltigheim, Alsace. It plays in the Championnat National 3, the fifth tier of football in France. It plays at the Stade de l'Aar in Schiltigheim, which has a capacity of 2,500.

The club was established on 1 March 1914 as Sports-Abteilung des Evangelischen Jugendbundes Schiltigheim, an ethnically-German church-based youth club in what was at the time Elsass in the German Empire. They adopted they name Fussball-Klub Schiltigheim in 1915. Following the end of World War I and the return of Alsace to France, the club was renamed Sporting Club de Schiltigheim in 1919.

History

Between France and Germany
During the interwar period, SC was a competitive local side that claimed the championship of the Alsace Champion Division d'Honneur in 1937, as well a regional cup title and a clutch of junior division titles in the mid-1930s. The club's rise was interrupted when Alsace came under German control after the Nazi invasion early in World War II. Like many other clubs in occupied territories, the Schiltigheim side became part of German football competition and played four seasons (1940–44) as Sport-Club Schiltigheim in what was initially called the Gauliga Unterelass (I) – later the Gauliga Elsass – one of several top-flight regional divisions. They earned a second-place result there in 1940–41 before slipping to become a lower table side. SC returned to French competition following the return of Alsace to France in 1945.

Postwar play
Following the war, SC was part of the Division d’Honneur Alsace until a title win advanced them to Division 4 play. Another title in 1993 that advanced the club to the Championnat de France amateur 2 level play where they spent four seasons until being sent down in 1997. Schiltigheim won its way to the Championnat de France Amateur Gr. B (IV) after a championship in the Championnat de France Amateur 2 Gr. C (V) in 2003. The team then struggled, narrowly missing relegation in 2006 before suffering consecutive demotions in the following two seasons. SC finished in second place in the Division d’Honneur Alsace (VI) in 2009.

In 2010, the club were champions of Division d'Honneur Alsace and gained promotion to CFA 2. They played at the fifth tier until 2017 when they won promotion again to the fourth tier division, Championnat National 2. They returned to the fifth tier in 2022.

Current squad

References

Football clubs in Germany
Sport in Haut-Rhin
Football clubs from former German territories
Association football clubs established in 1914
1914 establishments in France
Football clubs in Grand Est